Hebei University of Economics and Business is a university located in Shijiazhuang, the capital of Hebei province, China. It currently has four campuses.

Beginnings 
Founded in 1953 as the Shijiazhuang School of Supply and Sales administrated by Hebei Supply and Sales Corporation, the university brought together Hebei Financial Institute, Hebei Institute of Economics and Trade and Hebei Business College.

Hebei University of Economics and Business (HUEB) was established in 1995 under approval by the State Education Commission and through combination of four former colleges. HUEB is a regular full-time institution of higher learning; one of the key universities in Hebei Province and it offers degree programs both at undergraduate and postgraduate levels. It is situated Hebei University of Economics and Business is a multi-subject and in Shijiazhuang, the capital of Hebei Province, within easy access of Beijing.

University 
Hebei University of Economics and Business is a multi-subject and Comprehensive university offering a wide range of courses in Economics, Administration, Laws, Literature, Engineering and Science, with emphasis on the study of Economics. HUEB is privileged to confer Master's and bachelor's degrees on qualified students. At present the university has 13 master's degree programs and 39 bachelor's degree programs. The students of the university come from 16 Provinces, cities and self-governing municipality.

Campus 
It has four campuses in a different part of the city, covering a total area of 2.3 million square meters and the total floor space of its building is 700 thousand square meters. The university has four libraries at different campuses.

The university has 20 facilities and schools. The student population is more than 18000. Besides the above daytime students, the College of Continuing Education of the university has more than 13000 part-time students. There are over 2100 teaching and administrative staff members, among whom there are over 500 professors or associate professors. In recent years, the university has successively undertaken 200 research projects supported by the National "863" Program, the National Social Science Fund, the National Natural Science Fund, the Social Science Fund of the Ministry of Education, the Provincial Special Fund for Doctors and the Provincial Social Science Fund. It has published over 1000 books and teaching material and has more than 4000 articles published in publications both home and abroad, it has 17 inventions accredited to its name and won 105 prizes above provincial or ministry level. For recent years, the university has undertaken a large number of research projects from the state, provinces, municipalities and enterprises and has obtained a number of great and important achievements.

Courses 
The University is implementing a second-class administration; it has 15 undergraduate schools and 4 teaching departments. Meanwhile, it has postgraduate school, continuing education school and economic management school (independent school). The undergraduate education comprises 47 specialties, the subjects covers the economics, management law, art, science and engineering. The graduate school has 28 programs, among which 4 disciplines are the key ones, and 4 disciplines are the key constructive ones of Hebei Province.

The university recruits candidates from 22 provinces like Hebei, Tianjin, Liaoning, Shandong etc. 23000 undergraduates and 540 graduate candidates and continuing students are studying in the university.

They claim to "attach great importance to, and actively conduct, academic and cultural exchanges with overseas institutions." Such exchanges and collaborations are on the increase and cover more and more fields. They have so far established links with over 20 universities, academic institutions and cultural organizations in the U.S., UK, Russia, Korea, Canada, Japan, Switzerland, Belgium, Singapore and Malaysia and more. Hebei University of Economics and Business, a merger of the Trade and Finance Institute, the College of Trade and Economics and Hebei Commerce College, was founded in 1995. It is a key university with an emphasis in Hebei Province. It has a history of 50 years with 30 years of undergraduate education. In 2004, the result of the evaluation by the Ministry of Education was excellent.

Staff 
There are more than 2200 teaching and administrative staffs working in the university, among whom there are over 1105 full-time professional teachers. More than 55.5% of the teachers have already got a senior title of professional post. The university has 170 PhD tutors and PhD candidates, 545 postgraduates with a master's degree, accounting for 61% of the total number.

Geography 
The University is located in Shijiazhuang, the capital city of Hebei Province. It has four campuses: the north campus, the south campus, the east campus and the west campus, with the north campus as the headquarters, responsible for the education of undergraduates and postgraduates; the south and west campuses, the economic management school, as an independent second-class administration; the east campus, responsible for adult continuing education.

The university covers an area of about 3000 mu, 40% of which is the greenery patches and it is praised as a garden campus; and the neigh boring area of 55 square kilo meters belongs to "Hutu River Environmental Develop Project", therefore, with the construction of the project, this area will become a beautiful environmental scenic spot.

External links 
 Hebei University Main Page
 
 

Universities and colleges in Hebei
Business schools in China